Lærdalsøyri is the administrative centre of Lærdal Municipality in Vestland county, Norway. The village is located along the Lærdalselvi river where it empties into the Lærdalsfjorden, a branch off of the main Sognefjorden. Hauge Church is located in the village, and serves as the main church for the parish.

Name
The name Lærdalsøyri is derived from the local river which flows through the village. The first element is the genitive case of the old name of the river Lærr (now the river is called Lærdalselvi) and the last element is dalr which means "valley" or "dale." The meaning of the old river name is unknown. The last element -øyri is the finite form of øyr which means "sandbank"; it is similar to the word ayre which is used in Scotland and Orkney.

History

The village center is listed as a national "heritage village" and tourists come to see the old city center with its 161 wooden houses that date from 1700 to 1800. Old Lærdalsøyri used to be a trading port between east and west in Norway. It is located near the head of Sognefjord, one of the longest fjords in Norway, which meant sea-going ships could carry goods deep inland before landing them at the village for the over-land journey into eastern Norway.

Historically, several of the County Governors of Nordre Bergenhus lived in Lærdalsøyri while in office including Christian Ulrik Kastrup, Michael Conrad Sophus Emil Aubert, and Johan Collett Falsen.

2014 fire
At 22:56 (11:56 pm) on 18 January 2014, local fire departments were alerted to a fire in a residence on the Kyrkjegata road. Winds fanned the flames towards the town center, and the fire spread to a nearby forest, threatening the Old Lærdalsøyri heritage area. The town was evacuated at 00:30 (12:30 am), with residents evacuated to a hotel in the nearby municipality of Aurland. By 04:00 in the morning, over thirty houses were in flames.

Notable residents

Media gallery

References

External links

Pictures: Lærdalsoyri

Villages in Vestland
Lærdal